Sound Amplifier is an accessibility mobile application developed by Google for the Android operating system. It acts like a hearing aid using internet and artificial intelligence.

History 
Google launched Sound Amplifier in 2019 for Android 6.0 and above.

References

External links
 

Google software